London is the largest city in Southwestern Ontario, although Kitchener-Waterloo-Cambridge is a larger urban area. In London, there are 16 buildings that stand taller than 70 metres (230 ft). The tallest building in the city is the 24-storey,  One London Place. Originally there were plans to construct a twin tower called Two London Place; however, due to the recession of the early 1990s, this structure was never built.

Additionally, there are 10 high-rises that are planned to reach a height of at least 60 metres under construction, approved for construction, and proposed for construction in London.

Tallest buildings
This list ranks buildings in London that stand at least 60 m (197 ft) tall, based on CTBUH height measurement standards. This includes spires and architectural details but does not include antenna masts.

Projects
This list ranks London high-rises that are under construction, approved for construction and construction proposals that stand at least 30 m (197 ft) tall.

See also

 Canadian architecture
 List of tallest buildings in Canada
 List of tallest buildings in Ontario
 List of tallest buildings in Toronto
 List of tallest buildings in the Waterloo Regional Municipality

References

 Timeline 1980-1989 Events for the City of London, Ontario
 Timeline 1990-2000 Events for the City of London, Ontario
 London, Canada | Emporis

External links
 skyscraperpage.com